The 2012 FIM Fogo Italian Speedway Grand Prix was the eighth race meeting of the 2012 Speedway Grand Prix season. It took place on August 11, at the Pista Olimpia Terenzano stadium in Terenzano, Italy.

The Grand Prix was won by Antonio Lindbäck who beat Emil Sayfutdinov, Greg Hancock and Martin Vaculík. It was first SGP win for Lindbäck in his 52nd start. He and Fredrik Lindgren are the most "waiting for win" riders.

Riders 
The Speedway Grand Prix Commission nominated Nicolas Covatti as Wild Card, and Michele Paco Castagna and Nicolas Vicentin both as Track Reserves. Injured Jarosław Hampel was replaced by first Qualified Substitutes, Martin Vaculík for third time. The draw was made on August 10.
 (3)  Jarosław Hampel → (19)  Martin Vaculík

Results

Heat details

Heat after heat 
 (71,37) Lindbäck, Jonsson, Andersen, Lindgren
 (71,67) Sayfutdinov, Hancock, N. Pedersen, Crump
 (71,40) Holder, Ljung, B. Pedersen, Vaculík
 (71,59) Bjerre, Harris, Gollob, Covatti
 (72,43) Jonsson, Crump, Harris, B. Pedersen
 (72,81) Sayfutdinov, Ljung, Lindgren, Gollob (R)
 (72,69) N. Pedersen, Bjerre, Lindbäck, Holder
 (72,62) Vaculík, Hancock, Covatti, Andersen
 (73,28) Holder, Sayfutdinov, Jonsson, Covatti
 (73,06) Crump, Vaculík, Lindgren, Bjerre (R)
 (73,88) Hancock, Gollob, B. Pedersen, Lindbäck
 (76,09) Ljung, Harris, N. Pedersen, Andersen
 (74,38) Vaculík, Gollob, N. Pedersen, Jonsson
 (74,41) Harris, Lindgren, Holder, Hancock
 (74,15) Lindbäck, Crump, Ljung, Covatti
 (76,00) Andersen, Sayfutdinov, B. Pedersen, Bjerre
 (74,47) Hancock, Jonsson, Bjerre, Ljung
 (74,34) N. Pedersen, Covatti, Lindgren, B. Pedersen
 (73,25) Vaculík, Sayfutdinov, Lindbäck, Harris (X)
 (73,59) Crump, Holder, Gollob, Andersen
 Semifinals
 (73,07) Sayfutdinov, Lindbäck, N. Pedersen, Crump
 (73,88) Vaculík, Hancock, Holder, Jonsson (F)
 the Final
 (73,36) Lindbäck, Sayfutdinov, Hancock, Vaculík (X)

The intermediate classification

References

See also 
 motorcycle speedway

Italy
2012
Speedway